Peter Michael Whiston (born 4 January 1968) is an English former professional footballer who played as a defender.

He played a solitary game in the Premier League for Southampton during the 1994–95 season. He also played in the Football League for Plymouth Argyle, Torquay United, Exeter City and Shrewsbury Town, as well as non-league side Stafford Rangers.

Playing career
Whiston began his career in 1987 with Plymouth Argyle. He later moved to Torquay United in 1990 following a brief loan period. A year later he was on the move again and spent three season with Exeter City where he made 85 league appearances.

In the summer of 1994 he was signed by Alan Ball for Premier League side Southampton, but would only play a single game for the Saints. In 1995 he joined Shrewsbury Town following a loan spell, and later moved to non-league club Stafford Rangers where he spent the final nine-years of his career.

Personal life
Whiston is now a financial advisor.

References

Since 1888... The Searchable Premiership and Football League Player Database (subscription required)

1968 births
Living people
Association football defenders
English footballers
Exeter City F.C. players
Footballers from Widnes
Plymouth Argyle F.C. players
Premier League players
Shrewsbury Town F.C. players
Southampton F.C. players
Stafford Rangers F.C. players
Torquay United F.C. players